Pierson Ranch Recreation Area is a state recreation area in Yankton County, South Dakota in the United States. The area is open for year-round recreation including camping, swimming, fishing, hiking and boating.

Recreation
There are 67 campsites and 2 camper cabins. The area is popular for fishing, kayaking, and canoeing on Lake Yankton and the Missouri River. The campground was the first campground constructed by the U.S. Army Corps of Engineers (USACE) in 1959 following construction of the nearby Gavins Point Dam. In 2001 legislation transferred management of the recreation area from USACE to the South Dakota Department of Game, Fish and Parks as a part of the Lewis & Clark Recreation Area.

References

External links
 Pierson Ranch Recreation Area - South Dakota Department of Game, Fish, and Parks
 Gavins Point Project - U.S. Army Corps of Engineers

Protected areas of Yankton County, South Dakota
Protected areas of South Dakota
State parks of South Dakota